Gilles Ste-Croix is a Canadian entrepreneur and the vice president and co-creator of Cirque du Soleil. He started Cirque du Soleil with co-founder Guy Laliberté. His son, Olivier Rochette, a technician with Cirque du Soleil, was killed by a blow to the head from an aerial lift in an on-set accident in November 2016.

References

External links

Living people
French Quebecers
Canadian businesspeople
Circus owners
Cirque du Soleil
Canadian billionaires
Year of birth missing (living people)
Officers of the Order of Canada